Ishull Lezhë is a settlement in the Lezhë County, northwestern Albania. It is part of the former municipality Shëngjin. At the 2015 local government reform it became part of the municipality of Lezhë. The Mataj family is the most known in the district. The Mataj's have lived there for approximately 3 centuries.

References

Populated places in Lezhë
Villages in Lezhë County
Shëngjin